Maureen Milgram Forrest (1 February 1938, London) was a British co-founder of LeicesterHERday Trust and the original project director for the BRIT School in Croydon, London.  She is also known as Lillian Maureen Bernice Forrest. She was born in London, England on 1 February 1938 and died in Victoria, British Columbia, on 1 March 2013.

Life

Born in London in 1938, she emigrated to Toronto with her parents in the 1950s, where she attended the University of Toronto, gaining a graduate degree in Leisure Service Administration.  She later moved to Victoria, British Columbia, where she produced the musical The Wonder of it All at the Royal British Columbia Museum.  In 1987 she was awarded Victoria's Woman of the Year.

She returned to live in England in the late 1980s, where she was initially employed by the Leicester Mercury newspaper.  She was director of the Ken Chamberlain Trust.

In the late 1990s she was artistic director and chief executive of the Brewhouse Arts Centre in Burton upon Trent.

In 2009 Forrest was a judge for the Leicester First award, and presented it to Stuart Berry at the Walkers Stadium along with footballer Alan Birchenall.

She moved back to Victoria in 2010.

In 2010, she was awarded the Queen's Award for Enterprise Promotion.

Works 
 The INA Carlyle Winners of the Poetry Digest Love Poetry Competition 1994 (ed) (With Alan Forrest)

References 

Queen's Award for Enterprise Promotion (2010)
British businesspeople
2013 deaths
1938 births